The Château de Saumur, originally built as a castle and later developed as a château, is located in the French town of Saumur, in the Maine-et-Loire département. It was originally constructed in the 10th century by Theobald I, Count of Blois, as a fortified stronghold against Norman attacks. It overlooks the confluence of the rivers Loire and Thouet. In 1026 it came into the hands of Fulk Nerra, count of Anjou, who bequeathed it to his Plantagenet heirs. Following its destruction in 1067, the castle was rebuilt by Henry II of England in the later 12th century.

History

In the early part of the 13th century, Philip II of France made Saumur part of his royal domain. The page for September in the Tres Riches Heures du Duc de Berry depicts the Chateau as it looked in 1410. It changed hands several times until 1589 when the Protestant King Henry IV (of France and Navarre) gave the castle to Duplessis-Mornay.

In 1621 the castle was converted into an army barracks. Nearly two centuries later it was converted into a state prison under Napoleon Bonaparte.

In the first part of the 20th century, the city of Saumur acquired the castle and began a restoration program to house the museum of the decorative arts. In line with the Saumur area's equestrian tradition and its famous "Cadre Noir", the castle also serves as a Museum of the Horse. The castle has a dungeon and watchtower, and houses the Musée de la Figurine-Jouet, a collection of very old toys and figurines of soldiers, kings of France, and clowns.

The Château de Saumur has been listed as a monument historique by the French Ministry of Culture since 1862.

See also
List of castles in France

Notes

External links

 Visiting information (French)

Photos of Château Château de Saumur and other Loire castles
http://perso.orange.fr/saumur-jadis/lieux/chateau.htm

Castles in Pays de la Loire
Châteaux in Maine-et-Loire
Historic house museums in Pays de la Loire
Museums in Maine-et-Loire
Monuments historiques of Pays de la Loire